Cuttin' Loose is the second album led by guitarist Doug Raney recorded in 1978 and released on the Danish label, SteepleChase.

Reception 

Dave Nathan of AllMusic states "Cuttin' Loose is a steadfast mainstream jazz session, and is recommended".

Track listing 
 "Lean Years" (Pat Martino) – 5:59
 "How Deep Is the Ocean?" (Irving Berlin) – 9:37
 "Arrival" (Horace Parlan) – 4:09  Bonus track on CD
 "If You Could See Me Now" (Tadd Dameron) – 4:55
 "Frank-ly Speaking"  (Parlan) – 5:22
 "You Don't Know What Love Is" (Gene de Paul, Don Raye) – 8:09
 "Four" (Eddie Vinson) – 5:45

Personnel 
Doug Raney – guitar
Bernt Rosengren – tenor saxophone, flute
Horace Parlan – piano
Niels-Henning Ørsted Pedersen – bass
Billy Hart – drums

References 

Doug Raney albums
1979 albums
SteepleChase Records albums